Illana is a town and municipality in the province of Guadalajara, Spain, part of the autonomous community of Castile–La Mancha. It belongs to the natural region of La Alcarria.

References

External links 
Geography and history of Illana 
Another page of Illana 

Municipalities in the Province of Guadalajara